Armando Bini (Pisa, October 1, 1887 – Milan, October 31, 1954) was an Italian tenor.

Career
Bini began as a plumber but his music teacher, Professor Antoni,  directed him to sing his first song and encouraged him to study music. After military service, he had the chance to debut at the Teatro Carcano in Milan in 1914 in the role of Fernando of Favorita of Donizetti. In the same year, as requested by the organizers he also performed in Don Pasquale and Rossini's Barber of Seville, in the role of Almaviva.

From there a career blossomed that took him to sing in many theaters throughout Italy, including Florence (National Theater), Milan, Bari and Pisa. He also interpreted Pinkerton in Madama Butterfly alongside soprano Miura Tamaki in 1931 at the Teatro Verdi. In Pisa he was also active in Theater Politeama in several productions.

Bini also performed abroad, in Corsica in 1920 and he toured the Netherlands, where he was honored with the Amsterdam Knighthood of the Kingdom of the Netherlands.

References

Italian operatic tenors
1887 births
1954 deaths
People from Pisa
20th-century Italian male opera singers
Singers from Milan